was a Japanese daimyō of the Sengoku period. Harumune was the fifteenth head of the Date Clan. He was the father of the sixteenth head, Date Terumune, and the grandfather of the famous seventeenth head of the Date Clan and founder of the Sendai Clan as well as Sendai City in Miyagi Prefecture, Date Masamune.

Biography
A son of Date Tanemune, the fourteenth hereditary head of the Date Clan in Mutsu Province. Harumune's childhood name was Jiro (次郎). Harumune was intended to become head of the clan upon his father's death. However, Tanemune's method of consolidating power through the political marriages of his children led to the Tenbun War (天分の乱), a revolt led by Harumune. At first, Tanemune had the advantage but Harumune ultimately succeeded his father as leader of the clan. Harumune then moved to Yonezawa and worked to settle the aftermath of the war.

As a special honor, Ashikaga Yoshiharu gave permission for Harumune to use one ideograph (haru-) of his name. Additionally, the Ashikaga shogunate gave Harumune power and responsibilities as tendai of Mutsu.

Family

 Father: Date Tanemune
 Mother: Teishin'in
 Wife: Kubohime (1521–1594)
 Children:
 Iwaki Chikataka (d. 1594) by Kubohime
Onamihime (1541–1602) married Nikaido Moriyoshi by Kubohime
 Date Terumune by Kubohime
 daughter married Date Sanemoto (brother of Harumune) by Kubohime
 daughter married Koyanagawa Morimune by Kubohime
 daughter married Satake Yoshishige by Kubohime
 Rusu Masakage by Kubohime
 Ishikawa Akimitsu by Kubohime
 Hikohime married Ashina Morioki later married Ashina Moritaka by Kubohime
 Kokubu Morishige by Kubohime
 Sugime Naomune (d. 1584) by Kubohime

Retainers

References

Daimyo
1519 births
1578 deaths
Date clan
People from Sendai